Nacna malachitis is a moth in the family Noctuidae. It is found in Japan, the Russian Far East and Taiwan.

The wingspan is 28–30 mm.

References

Moths described in 1880
Acronictinae
Moths of Japan